Here Come The Vikings is the fourth solo album by Scottish singer-songwriter Astrid Williamson which, as with her previous release, Day Of The Lone Wolf, she produced.

Allmusic suggested 'she wraps naked sentiments of love, lust and lament in her breathy voice'

Track listing 
 Store
 Sing The Body Electric
 Shut Your Mouth
 How You Take My Breath Away
 Crashing Minis
 Falling Down
 Pinned
 Slake
 Eve
 The Stars Are Beautiful

Personnel 
 Astrid Williamson - vocals, electric guitar, keyboards, programming
 Richard Yale - bass guitar
 Chris Parsons - drums and percussion
 Steven Parker - guitar and tambourine
 Nick Powell - keyboards
 Guy Barker - trumpet
 Mark Treffel - organ and Wurlitzer
 Ben Evans - percussion
 Ruth Gottlieb - violin, viola
 Sarah Wilson - cello
 David Pickering Pick - tubular bells
 Sian Buss - euphonium
 Martin Buss - cornet  
Mixing by Astrid Williamson and David Pickering Pick

Mastered and recorded by David Pickering Pick

Cover photography by Nicole Gallard

References 

2009 albums
Astrid Williamson albums